Adil El Makssoud (born December 12, 1985) is a Moroccan professional basketball player. He currently plays for the CRA Hoceima club of the Nationale 1, Morocco’s first division.

He represented Morocco's national basketball team at the 2017 AfroBasket in Tunisia and Senegal, where he recorded most steals for Morocco.

References

External links
 FIBA profile
 Real GM profile
 Afrobasket.com profile

1985 births
Living people
Moroccan men's basketball players
Place of birth missing (living people)
Shooting guards
Small forwards
Sportspeople from Casablanca